Something's Got to Give is an unfinished American feature film shot in 1962, directed by George Cukor for 20th Century Fox and starring Marilyn Monroe, Dean Martin and Cyd Charisse. A remake of My Favorite Wife (1940), a screwball comedy starring Irene Dunne and Cary Grant, it was Monroe's last work, but from the beginning its production was disrupted by her personal troubles, and after her death on August 4, 1962, the film was abandoned. Most of its completed footage remained unseen for many years.

20th Century Fox overhauled the entire production idea the following year with mostly new cast and crew and produced their My Favorite Wife remake, now titled Move Over, Darling (1963) and starring Doris Day, James Garner, and Polly Bergen.

Plot
Ellen Arden, a photographer and mother of two small children, has been declared legally dead, having been lost at sea in the Pacific. Her husband Nick has remarried; he and his new wife, Bianca, are on their honeymoon when Ellen, rescued from an island where she has been stranded for five years, returns home. The family dog remembers her, but the children do not. However, they take a liking to her, and invite her to stay. Ellen assumes a foreign accent and pretends to be a woman named Ingrid Tic. Nick, flustered by the revelation that he's now married to two women, makes great effort to keep the truth from his new wife all the while trying to quash her amorous advances. Upon learning that Ellen was marooned on the island with a man, Stephen Burkett whom she knew as "Adam" to her "Eve"—he becomes jealous and suspicious of her fidelity. To calm his fears, Ellen enlists a meek shoe salesman to impersonate her island companion.

Cast

 Marilyn Monroe as Ellen Wagstaff Arden
 Dean Martin as Nicholas Arden
 Cyd Charisse as Bianca Russell Arden
 Tom Tryon as Stephen Burkett
 Wally Cox as Shoe Salesman
 Phil Silvers as Insurance Salesman
 Steve Allen as Psychiatrist
 John McGiver as Judge
 Robert Christopher Morley as Timmy Arden
 Alexandria Heilweil as Lita Arden

Pre-production
The film's script was written by Arnold Schulman, Nunnally Johnson and Walter Bernstein, and was an update of the 1940 film's story by Leo McCarey and Samuel and Bella Spewack, which itself was a comedic update of "Enoch Arden", a tragic 1864 poem by Alfred, Lord Tennyson. This was to be the sixth film version based on the Tennyson poem.

Several weeks before principal photography began, the cast and crew gathered for wardrobe tests on a set that was a fully lit recreation of George Cukor's Beverly Hills home. Production designer Gene Allen had sent a crew of men to Cukor's home at 9166 Cordell Drive to photograph the house and pool areas of the estate. According to Allen, Cukor was photographed in the set's courtyard with the intent of using the photo as his 1962 Christmas card.

Marilyn Monroe had been absent from the screen for over a year. In six hours of testing, Monroe wore some of her own clothes and some of those commissioned by Fox for the film. Her costumes included a long blonde wig meant for the beginning of the film, a two-piece black wool suit (also worn in Let's Make Love), a black and white spaghetti strap silk dress, and a lime green two-piece bathing suit with a bottom designed to cover her navel.

Before shooting had begun, Monroe had let producer Henry Weinstein know that she had been asked by the White House to perform for President John F. Kennedy at Madison Square Garden in honor of his birthday on May 29, 1962. The producer granted her permission to attend the gala, believing there would be no problems on the set.

The original male lead was to be James Garner who opted to make The Great Escape; Dean Martin replaced him. Garner would play the male lead in Move Over Darling.

Production
On the first day of production, April 23, 1962, Monroe telephoned Weinstein to tell him that she had a severe sinus infection and would not be on the set that morning. Apparently she had caught the infection after a trip to New York City during which she had visited her acting coach, Lee Strasberg of The Actors Studio, to go over her role. The studio sent staff physician Dr. Lee Siegel to examine the star at her home. His diagnosis would have postponed the movie for a month, but George Cukor refused to wait. Instead he reorganized the shooting schedule to film scenes around his leading lady. At 7:30 am, Cyd Charisse was telephoned and summoned to the Fox lot. Later that morning the first scene filmed involved Martin's character and Charisse, in an encounter with children building a tree house.

Over the next month filming continued mostly without Monroe, who showed up only occasionally due to fever, headaches, chronic sinusitis and bronchitis. The production  fell 10 days behind schedule. As Kennedy's birthday approached, no one on the production thought Monroe would keep her commitment to the White House although she had gotten clearance on April 9 to appear at the event (see article "Happy Birthday, Mr. President"). Studio documents released after Monroe's death confirm her appearance at the political fundraising event that had been approved by Fox executives.

By this time, the production was over budget, and the script was still not completely finalized, despite writer Walter Bernstein's efforts. The script was rewritten nightly, with Monroe growing increasingly frustrated at having to memorize new scenes every day. When not before the camera, she spent much of her time on the set in her dressing room with Paula Strasberg, Lee's wife.

Pool scene
Upon her return from New York, Monroe decided to give the film a publicity boost by doing something no major Hollywood actress had done before; in the scene in which Ellen is swimming in the pool at night, she calls playfully up to Nick's bedroom window and invites him to join her. Nick tells her to get out of the pool, then realizes she is nude. A body stocking was made for her, but Monroe took it off and swam around in only a flesh-colored bikini bottom. The set was closed to all but necessary crew, but Monroe had asked photographers, including William Woodfield, to come in. After filming was completed, Monroe was photographed in the bikini bottom, and without it.

Had Something's Got to Give been completed and released as planned, Monroe would have been the first mainstream star shown topless in a Hollywood motion picture release of the sound era. Instead, that distinction goes to actress Jayne Mansfield in Promises! Promises! (1963).

Monroe's last day on the set
On Friday, June 1, 1962, Monroe's 36th birthday, she, Martin and Wally Cox shot a scene in the courtyard set. Monroe's stand-in, Evelyn Moriarty, bought a seven-dollar sheet cake at the Los Angeles Farmers Market. A studio illustrator drew a cartoon of a nude Monroe holding a towel, which read "Happy Birthday (Suit)". It was to be used as a birthday card, and signed by the cast and crew. The cast attempted to celebrate when Monroe arrived, but Cukor insisted that they wait until 6:00 pm (the end of the working day) because he wanted to get a "full day's work out of her."

It would be Monroe's last day on the set. She left the party with Cox, and had borrowed the fur-trimmed grey suit she had worn while filming that day because she was to attend a muscular dystrophy fundraiser at Dodger Stadium that evening with her former husband Joe DiMaggio and co-star Dean Martin's young son, Dean Paul Martin.

Monroe is fired
On Monday, June 4, 1962, Monroe phoned Henry Weinstein to inform him that she would not be on set that day once again. She had a flare-up of the sinusitis, and her temperature had reached 100 °F (37.8 °C). At a studio meeting, Cukor strongly endorsed her dismissal, and she was fired from the project on June 8, 1962. Life featured Marilyn, wrapped in a blue terrycloth robe, on its June 22, 1962 cover with the headline, "The skinny dip you'll never see on the screen."

The decision to fire Monroe was influenced by the progress of Fox's epic film Cleopatra, also in production that summer and far over its budget. Executives had planned a Christmas holiday release for Something's Got to Give, as a source of revenue to offset Cleopatra'''s increasing cost.

Monroe quickly gave interviews and photo essays for Life, Cosmopolitan, and Vogue magazines. The Life interview with Richard Meryman, published on August 3, 1962–just two days before her death—included her reflections on the positive and negative aspects of fame. "Fame is fickle," she said. "I now live in my work and in a few relationships with the few people I can really count on. Fame will go by, and so long, I've had you, fame. If it goes by, I've always known it was fickle. So, at least it's something I experienced, but that's not where I live."

Subsequent events

After Monroe's dismissal, her role was offered to actresses Kim Novak and Shirley MacLaine, but both declined. It was soon reported that she was to be replaced with Lee Remick, who was fitted into Monroe's costumes and photographed with Cukor along with Bergen being filmed playing selected scenes from the film.

Dean Martin had final approval of his leading lady, and refused to continue without Monroe. Aside from being friends with Martin, Monroe had personally selected the cast (including Martin and Cox) over Fox's desire she do the film with James Garner and Don Knotts, the two stars who ended up in the Doris Day version. Fox relented and re-hired her, even agreeing to pay her more than her previous salary of $100,000, with the stipulation that she make this and one more film at $500,000 per film, plus a bonus if completed on time. The second film was slated to be What a Way to Go!, which was eventually filmed with Shirley MacLaine. Monroe accepted the offer on the condition Cukor be replaced with Jean Negulesco, who had directed her in How to Marry a Millionaire. Filming was set to resume in October, but no more work was done after Monroe's death on August 4.

In April 1963, Fox released the 83-minute documentary Marilyn, which included brief clips from the screen tests and unfinished film showing Monroe. This was the only footage from the film seen by the public until the hour-long 1990 documentary Marilyn: Something's Got to Give, which used extensive excerpts from the footage. 

Fox later produced another version of the script by Arnold Schulman, who walked off the film when he saw what Fox was planning for Monroe. The Nunnally Johnson and Walter Bernstein scripts were rewritten by Hal Kanter and Jack Sher, more closely resembling the original 1940 film. Fox asked Kanter to fashion a film around all the existing film footage, and then release it without ever having to bring Monroe back, with a technique previously used for Jean Harlow in Saratoga that made use of a double for certain scenes. This request came despite Fox's insistence that only mere minutes existed of Monroe on film, despite there being crates full of scenes shot repeatedly with no perceptible difference. All this maneuvering was dropped after Monroe and Fox came to new terms on her adjusted contract. The newer version utilized some of the sets from the abandoned version, as well as costumes (with variations) and hairstyles designed for Monroe. Retitled Move Over, Darling and starring Doris Day, James Garner and Polly Bergen, the film was released by 20th Century Fox on Christmas day, 25 December 1963.

 Reconstruction 
Nine hours of unedited footage and separate sound tracks from the unfinished film remained in the vaults at 20th Century Fox until 1989, when the material was discovered by producers of Fox Entertainment News (FEN) and assembled into the one-hour documentary Marilyn: Something's Got to Give. Commissioned by Fox chairman Barry Diller, the film first aired on Fox stations in 1990, written, produced and presented by Henry Schipper. The film sequences edited by FEN's post-production team were later repurposed by Prometheus Entertainment for the documentary Marilyn Monroe: The Final Days'', which aired on AMC on June 1, 2001, the 75th anniversary of Monroe's birth. During the original broadcasts, footage with Lee Remick was included in the documentary but subsequently removed and no longer available to the public.

See also

 List of American films of 1962

References

External links
 
 
 
 
 

1962 films
20th Century Fox films
American romantic comedy films
Comedy of remarriage films
1960s English-language films
Films based on Enoch Arden
Films directed by George Cukor
Remakes of American films
1960s unfinished films
Films with screenplays by Nunnally Johnson
Films with screenplays by Walter Bernstein
1960s American films